Laura León (born Rebeca Velderrain Vera on November 24, 1952, in Comalcalco, Tabasco) is a Mexican actress and singer.

Discography
2009: Lo Nuevo
2000: Mi Tesoro Eres Tú
1999: Mujeres Engañadas
1998: Laura León
1996: Es el Premio Mayor
1995: Embajadora de la Cumbia
1994: Boleros para el Amor
1993: Tesorito... Baila Conmigo
1992: El Club de Mujeres Engañadas
1988: No Me Toques Que Me Rompo
1987: Laura León con Sabor a... 
1985: Mi Tesorito
1984: Ritmo Ardiente
1982: El Fuego del Tropico Hecho Mujer
1982: La Tesorito de Oro
1982: El Fuego del Trópico Hecho Mujer
1978: La Máquina del Sabor

Filmography

References

External links

 Laura León at the Telenovela Database
 Laura León at mp3.com

1952 births
Living people
Mexican telenovela actresses
Mexican film actresses
Mexican women singers
Mexican television talk show hosts
Mexican vedettes
Actresses from Tabasco
Singers from Tabasco
People from Comalcalco
Women in Latin music